The Gallery at South DeKalb, formerly South DeKalb Mall, is a shopping mall owned by Thor Equities. The mall is located at the intersection of Candler Road and Interstate 20 in the Panthersville CDP of DeKalb County, Georgia.

History 
The mall opened in 1968 with anchors Rich's and JCPenney. This mall also faced competition from the beginning with several other malls in DeKalb County, mainly Northlake Mall. The Rich's also had an automotive center similar to most Sears of the time. During the early 1970s, the mall sported signage and a logo with the words South DeKalb Mall rendered in bas-relief SFIntellivised font, similar to the lettering used in the opening credits of the then-famous Mary Tyler Moore television series, only in the mall's version, accompanied by a bas-relief asterisk placed tightly among the letters of the mall's name.  As of 2014, the mall's signage still pays homage to the original font. The modern signage is lighted. The former signage was dark brown and made of metal, and was not.

JCPenney left the mall in 2001 as it relocated to Stonecrest. The space left behind by the anchor has been occupied by a furniture store called Amazing Rooms. The Chick-Fil-A closed at the end of January 2012.

South DeKalb Mall became known recently as "The Gallery at South DeKalb" partly reflecting its new owners ideas to change the image of the mall. Currently the mall's anchor stores are Macy's (formerly Rich's), Amazing Rooms, and American Screen Works has built a 14-screen movie theater with stadium seating and an entertaining jazz lounge. The Mall is also home to a Piccadilly Cafeteria and a small office center behind the mall.

The competition is still fierce for The Gallery at South DeKalb with the recent addition in 2001 of the long-awaited Mall at Stonecrest eight miles southeast in nearby Lithonia. 

On January 7, 2020, it was announced that Macy's would close, as part of a plan to close 125 stores nationwide. The store closed on March 17, 2020, leaving the mall with no anchor stores.

References

External links
Corporate Website
Dekalb County Visitors' Bureau

Buildings and structures in DeKalb County, Georgia
Shopping malls established in 1968
Shopping malls in the Atlanta metropolitan area
Tourist attractions in DeKalb County, Georgia
Decatur, Georgia